Association football is one of the national sports of Scotland and the most popular sport in the country. There is a long tradition of "football" games in Orkney, Lewis and southern Scotland, especially the Scottish Borders, although many of these include carrying the ball and passing by hand, and despite bearing the name "football" bear little resemblance to association football.

Founded in 1873, Scotland has the second oldest national Football Association in the world (behind England's FA), and has various professional and amateur levels. The trophy for the national cup, the Scottish Cup, is the oldest national sporting trophy in the world. Scotland and Scottish football clubs hold many records for football attendances.

Origins

A game known as "football" was played in Scotland as early as the 15th century. It was prohibited by the Football Act 1424, as it distracted men from their marital duties, and although the law fell into disuse, it was not repealed until 1906. The sport was played by commoners and royalty, such as King James VI and Mary, Queen of Scots, alike. In Perth, apprentices progressing to become master craftsmen in the 16th-century had to pay for a banquet and a game of football.

There is evidence for schoolboys playing a "football" ball game in Aberdeen in 1633 (some references cite 1636) which is notable as an early allusion to what some have considered to be passing the ball. In the 1700s, Football was known to cause riots and severe damage to both property and players. Football in general had almost an ill repute.  Football was mainly played during times of festival like New Years Day or Fastern's E'en. During these events, football was a "mass participant, low regulation event". There were also separate matches for men and women.  Association Football's use as a leisure sport started in the 1840s as working schedules started to shift with the introduction of the half day work schedule on Saturdays.  This search for "rational recreation" was brought upon by the temperance movement along with city municipal and philanthropic projects. By the late 1800s, Association Football was one of the major cultural activities among the male population of Western Scotland, both as player and as spectator.  Railroads helped with accessibility for travel to games in other cities, making a professional league viable.  Of the thirty seven football grounds in existence in 1887, twenty of them were within one hundred yards of a railroad station.

It is clear that the game was rough and tackles allowed included the "charging" and pushing/holding of opposing players ("drive that man back" in the original translation, "repelle eum" in original Latin). It has been suggested that this game bears similarities to rugby football. Contrary to media reports in 2006 there is no reference to forward passing, game rules, marking players or team formation. These reports described it as "an amazing new discovery" but has actually been well documented in football history literature since the early twentieth century and available on the internet since at least 2000. English public schools, such as Eton and Harrow, "civilised" the game by drawing up rules that encouraged players to kick the ball and forbade them from carrying it.

Scottish Football Association
The Scottish Football Association (SFA) is the principal organising body for Scottish football. Members of the SFA include clubs in Scotland, affiliated national associations as well as local associations. It was formed in March 1873, making it the World's second oldest national football association.  The founding clubs were Queen's Park, Clydesdale, Vale of Leven, Dumbreck, Third Lanark, Eastern Granville and Kilmarnock.

The SFA is responsible for the operation of the Scotland national football team, the annual Scottish Cup and several other duties important to the functioning of the game in Scotland.

League

Professional league football in Scotland is run by the Scottish Professional Football League (SPFL) comprising 4 tiers. Feeding into the bottom tier of the SPFL is the Scottish Highland Football League, and the Scottish Lowland Football League. Other leagues -  East of Scotland League, South of Scotland League, West of Scotland League and the North Caledonian League are deemed to be "senior" and are administered by the Scottish Football Association. Administered separately are clubs in the  Scottish Junior Football Association and Scottish Amateur Football Association. In 2014-15 season, a promotion and relegation scheme between the SPFL and the Highland and Lowland Leagues came into operation.

Rangers' record attendance of 118,567 is a British record for a league match.

Scottish Professional Football League

The Scottish Professional Football League is a four tier football league system consisting of 42 teams. There are 12 teams in the top tier, the Scottish Premiership, and 10 in each of the lower three tiers, named the Scottish Championship, Scottish League One and Scottish League Two.

The Scottish Premiership is the top league in Scotland, and consists of 12 teams. It has existed since 2013, when the Scottish Premier League and the Scottish Football League merged into the SPFL. The top tier of Scottish football is traditionally home to one of the world's most famous football rivalries, between Rangers and Celtic. Together the two clubs are known as the Old Firm, by virtue of the profitability of their rivalry. Rangers have won 55 Scottish league championships, which was a world record when the 55th title was won (2021) but has since been overtaken by Northern Irish club Linfield (56). Celtic, who have won 52 Scottish league championships, were the first non-Latin and first team from Great Britain to win the European Cup, in 1967. The Old Firm rivalry was interrupted in 2012, when the company running Rangers went into liquidation and the club was forced to restart in the fourth tier of Scottish Football. The rivalry was resumed in September 2016, after Rangers had been promoted into the Scottish Premiership.

The second, third and fourth tiers in the league structure are called the Scottish Championship, Scottish League One and Scottish League Two respectively, each consisting of 10 teams. Teams are relegated and promoted between the divisions. Relegation from the fourth tier may occur at the end of every season (from 2014-15 thereafter); the last placed team in the fourth tier will play the winner of a play-off between the Highland and Lowland League champions. Dismissal from the fourth tier is still possible, however, if a club finishes bottom three seasons in a row. In case of dismissal or withdrawal of a team (such as for economic reasons, etc.) a senior non-League level side can be elected in its place.

The top team in the Championship is eligible for promotion to the Premiership. Since the 2013-14 season, a second promotion place is available via play-offs between 3 Championship sides and 1 Premiership side. Falkirk were refused possible entry to the top tier in 2000 and 2003 due to not meeting the stadium requirements. Previously, requirements were that clubs had to have 10,000 seats in their ground, but this was changed to 6,000. Clubs must also have under-soil heating systems to prevent cancellation of matches caused by frozen pitches.

Queen's Park, uniquely, were the only true amateur (players are not paid) member of the League still standing, having been a League member since 1900, until its membership voted to end that status in 2019.

Senior non-league level
Immediately below the SPFL are two regionalised leagues:

 Highland Football League is a league of 18 clubs covering the north, north east and north west of Scotland, not just the Highlands as its name would suggest. This has been hard hit by a number of 'defections' to the Scottish Football League, though the Highland League has compensated by admitting new teams to its league in a similar way. Recent examples include Formartine United, Turriff United and Strathspey Thistle, who all joined the league in 2009
 Lowland Football League is a league of 18 clubs operating in the Scottish Lowlands, drawn from teams previously competing in the East of Scotland and South of Scotland.

At the end of the season a play-off is held between the champions of the Highland League and the Lowland League. The winner plays the bottom club in the SPFL League Two for a place in League Two in the following season.

Other "senior" leagues are 
 East of Scotland Football League, covering Fife, Edinburgh, Lothian, Perth, and the Scottish Borders
 South of Scotland Football League, covering the south west of Scotland
 West of Scotland Football League, covering the west of Scotland
 North Caledonian Football League, covering the far north of Scotland

There is no automatic promotion between these leagues and the Lowland or Highland Leagues, however a play-off takes place between the champions of the East of Scotland, South of Scotland, and West of Scotland for promotion to the Lowland League, subject to clubs meeting the required licensing criteria.

Clubs at level 6 automatically enter the Scottish Cup Preliminary Rounds provided they are members of the Scottish Football Association.

Junior football
Operating separately from the SPFL professional leagues and the four senior leagues, are the two junior leagues. Although called junior, this refers to the level of football played, not the age of the participants. The junior leagues are organised by the Scottish Junior Football Association and are regionalised into two areas, East and North. There is a Scottish Junior Cup which all members of the association participate in, having done so since the Nineteenth century.

Junior clubs, unlike those in the senior non-league level, were not in the main eligible to participate in the Scottish Cup until 2007–08. The one previous exception to this rule, Girvan, participated in the Scottish Qualifying Cup (South) by virtue of the fact that they opted to switch from the senior level to the junior level, but still retained their right to attempt to qualify. From the 2007–08 Scottish Cup however, the winners of each of the two (previously three) regional leagues and the winner of the Junior Cup enter the first round of the Scottish Cup proper, following a decision by the SFA to allow them entry at their previous Annual General Meeting. Additional junior clubs (Banks o'Dee) have received an SFA licence which permits them to participate in the Scottish Cup.

Amateur football
There are a vast number of amateur footballers in Scotland. They play in leagues across the country of varying standard, usually confined to a specific localised geographic area. Many amateur clubs run teams in more than one of the amateur leagues. Some of the teams are well known with a history of success and producing players who go on to a higher level, such as Drumchapel Amateur. The activities of clubs at the amateur level are co-ordinated by the Scottish Amateur Football Association.

The winner of the Scottish Amateur Cup enters the Scottish FA Cup in the following season.

There are three categories of amateur football administered by the SAFA - "Winter" Saturday, "Winter" Sunday and Summer football.  Summer football tends to be popular in the Northern and Western Isles and in the north of the mainland. In addition to the Scottish Amateur Cup (for 'Saturday' teams) there is the Scottish Sunday Amateur Trophy and the Highland Amateur Cup for summer teams.

Cup competitions

Scottish Cup
The Scottish Cup is the world's oldest national cup but not the oldest competition, first contested in 1873 and being predated only by England's FA Cup. It is a pure knockout tournament with single matches, with replays being held if the first match is a tie. All 42 SPFL clubs automatically enter the tournament. A number of non-league clubs used to participate by virtue of having qualified through one of two regionalised qualifying cups (since 2007–08 they have qualified automatically for the First Round); or since 2007–08 by having won the Scottish Junior Cup or one of the three regionalised Junior leagues. The final is usually played at Hampden Park. The attendance of 146,433 for the 1937 Scottish Cup Final between Celtic and Aberdeen at Hampden Park is a European record for a club match.

Scottish League Cup
The Scottish League Cup is open to members of the SPFL and the Highland League and Lowland League champions. It has been contested since the 1946–47 season and was the first ever League Cup formed.

Scottish Challenge Cup
The Scottish Challenge Cup is open to members of the SPFL clubs contesting in the Championship, League One & League Two and the top four clubs in the Highland League and Lowland League, and has been contested since the 1990–91 season. Since 2016–17 season all 12 Premiership Development teams have taken part in the competition along with teams from the Welsh Premier League and Northern Irish Premiership, with teams from the English National League joining in
2017–18 season.

Scottish Junior Cup
The Scottish Junior Cup is contested by all members of the SJFA and has been competed for since the 1886–87 season. Currently, up to 132 teams are eligible to take part.

Scottish Amateur Cup
The Scottish Amateur Cup is the principal competition for amateur clubs, competed for since 1909–10. Currently around 600 clubs enter.

Scottish Irn Bru Schools Cup
The Scottish Irn Bru Schools Cup is contested by Scotland's Schools and has been done since 1999. Currently 190 schools can take part.

Current Scottish national cup eligibility summary

European competitions

Three Scottish clubs have won UEFA competitions. Celtic won the 1967 European Cup Final, then lost the 1970 European Cup Final. The highest ever attendance for a UEFA competition match was in the 1969–70 European Cup semi-final at Hampden Park, Scotland's National stadium. A record 136,505 people attended that Cup semi-final played between Celtic and Leeds United. 

Rangers won the 1972 European Cup Winners' Cup Final, and reached the finals of the same competition in 1961 & 1967, losing out both times. The most recent victory by a Scottish club in a European competition was when Aberdeen won the 1983 European Cup Winners' Cup Final and then won the consequent 1983 UEFA Super Cup. 

No Scottish club has won the UEFA Cup / UEFA Europa League, although three have reached the final. Dundee United reached the 1987 final, and their fans won an award for their good behaviour from UEFA after their defeat to IFK Gothenburg. Celtic fans won a similar award after their team lost in extra-time to FC Porto in the 2003 final. Rangers lost 2–0 to Zenit in the 2008 final. The most recent appearance by a Scottish club in a European final was when Rangers lost on penalties to Eintracht Frankfurt in the 2022 UEFA Europa League Final.

National team

The Scottish national team represents Scotland in international football and is controlled by the Scottish Football Association. The team has played international football longer than any other nation in the world along with England, whom they played in the world's first international football match at Hamilton Crescent, Partick, Glasgow in 1872. Scotland have qualified for eight World Cups and three European Championships, but have never progressed beyond the first round.

The majority of Scotland's home matches are played at Hampden Park in Glasgow, opened in 1903. The Scottish team have become famous for their travelling support, known as the Tartan Army, who have won awards from UEFA for their combination of vocal support, friendly nature and charity work. The attendance of 149,415 for the Scotland vs. England match of 1937 at Hampden Park is also a European record.

Clubs

Seasons
The following articles detail the major results and events in each season since 1871-72. Each article provides the final league tables for that season, with the exception of the current one, as well as details on cup results, Scotland national football team results and a summary of any other important events during the season.

Women's football

As in the men's game, the women's league structure consists of a Premier League and a Football League with Divisions One and Two, but the second division is split into North, West, and Central & East regions. In the women's SFL, reserve and youth squads may compete as long as they do not compete in the same division as the titular club. There are also four cup competitions, the Scottish Cup, Scottish Premier League Cup, Scottish First Division Cup and the Scottish Second Division Cup.

See also
 Tartan Army
 Sport in Scotland
 Scottish youth football system
 List of defunct football leagues in Scotland
 Football in the United Kingdom

Bibliography
Brogan, Tom. We Made Them Angry: Scotland at the World Cup Spain 1982.
Bleasdale, John. Scotland's Swedish Adventure: The Story of Scotland's European Championship Debut.
Doherty, Neil. World Cup 1998: Scotland's Story.

References

External links
Scottish Professional Football League
Scottish Football Association

 

lt:Škotijos futbolo sistema